The 1954 World Table Tennis Championships – Swaythling Cup (men's team) was the 21st edition of the men's team championship.  

Japan won the gold medal defeating Czechoslovakia 5–4 in the decisive final group match. England won the bronze medal after finishing third in the final group.

Medalists

Swaythling Cup tables

Group 1

Group 2

Group 3

Final group

Decisive group match

See also
List of World Table Tennis Championships medalists

References

-